The Men's 200 metre backstroke competition at the 2017 World Championships was held on 27 and 28 July 2017.

Records
Prior to the competition, the existing world and championship records were as follows.

Results

Heats
The heats were held on 27 July at 09:51.

Semifinals
The semifinals were held on 27 July at 19:03.

Semifinal 1

Semifinal 2

Final
The final was held on 28 July at 17:40.

References

Men's 200 metre backstroke